Helen Campbell Brown (1917 – 1986) was a New Zealand artist. Works by Brown are included in the Museum of New Zealand Te Papa Tongarewa.

Career 
Brown worked primarily in oils and watercolor. Works by Brown include: Old sheds, Avondale; The Doorway (1949); The Cove (1954); and Ebb Tide (1950).

Brown exhibited with:
 Auckland Society of Arts
 Canterbury Society of Arts
 Rutland Group
 The Group in 1949
Her work is featured in Christopher Johnstone's book Landscape Paintings of New Zealand (2013).

References

Further reading 
Artist files for Helen Brown are held at:
 Angela Morton Collection, Takapuna Library
 E. H. McCormick Research Library, Auckland Art Gallery Toi o Tāmaki
 Fine Arts Library, University of Auckland
 Hocken Collections Uare Taoka o Hākena
 Te Aka Matua Research Library, Museum of New Zealand Te Papa Tongarewa
Also see
 Concise Dictionary of New Zealand Artists McGahey, Kate (2000) Gilt Edge

1910s births
1986 deaths
New Zealand painters
New Zealand women painters
Artists from Auckland
Elam Art School alumni
People associated with the Museum of New Zealand Te Papa Tongarewa
People associated with the Rutland Group
University of Auckland alumni
People associated with the Canterbury Society of Arts
People associated with the Auckland Society of Arts
20th-century New Zealand women artists
People associated with The Group (New Zealand art)